Otgar, Otger or Odgar is a Germanic masculine given name (from Proto-Germanic *Audawakraz). It may refer to:

 (fl. 8th century), missionary
Autchar (fl. 8th century), Frankish nobleman
Otgar of Mainz, archbishop (826–847)
, bishop of Eichstätt (847–880)
Hoger (died 906), abbot and music theorist
Otgar, founding abbot of Saint-Pons-de-Thomières (937–940)
Otgar, bishop of Speyer (962–970)
, Catalan count (c.862–c.872)
Otger Cataló, figure of Catalan legend

See also
Hoger
Ogier (disambiguation)